Holanda Esporte Clube, commonly known as Holanda, is a Brazilian football club based in Rio Preto da Eva, Amazonas. They won the Campeonato Amazonense once and competed in the Série C and in the Copa do Brasil once.

History
The club was founded on October 24, 1984 as Curumim. After they became a professional team, the club was founded again on October 21, 2007 as Holanda Esporte Clube. They won the Campeonato Amazonense Second Level in 2007 and the Campeonato Amazonense in 2008. Holanda competed in the Série C in 2008, when the club was eliminated in the Second Stage. The team competed in the Copa do Brasil in 2009, when they were eliminated in the First Stage by Coritiba.

Stadium
Holanda Esporte Clube play their home games at Estádio Francisco Garcia, commonly known as Chicão. The stadium has a maximum capacity of 8,000 people.

Achievements

 Campeonato Amazonense:
 Winners (1): 2008
 Campeonato Amazonense Second Level:
 Winners (1): 2007

References

External links
 Official website

Football clubs in Amazonas (Brazilian state)
Association football clubs established in 1984
Association football clubs established in 2007
1984 establishments in Brazil
2007 establishments in Brazil